iDVD is a discontinued DVD authoring application for Mac OS produced by Apple Inc. iDVD allows the user to burn QuickTime movies, MP3 music, and digital photos to a DVD that can then be played on a commercial DVD player. It was often considered the last step of Apple's iLife suite, bringing together the results of all of the other iLife apps onto a removable medium.

Availability
While initially available only for Macs with a SuperDrive, it was included until 2011 with all new Macs; from iDVD 6 onwards, Apple supported the ability to burn projects with third-party optical drives. iDVD was no longer preinstalled on Macs shipping with Mac OS X 10.7 Lion, and was not available on the Mac App Store with all of the other iLife apps. It was, however, still available in the boxed copy of iLife '11, until the release of iLife '13. It is no longer functional on macOS 10.15+ because it is not a 64-bit application.

Description
iDVD included over 100 Apple-designed themes for DVD menus and submenus, which allowed for the easy creation of DVD menu systems. Each theme included "drop zones," onto which movies or photographs could be placed, some of which could be animated automatically. Any theme could be applied to each of the menus in an iDVD project.

iDVD integrated tightly with the rest of the iLife suite, as well as with Final Cut Express and Final Cut Pro. iMovie projects and iPhoto slideshows could be exported directly to iDVD. In the case of iMovie projects, scene selection menus were automatically created in accordance with chapter markers that were set within iMovie. The application also had a Media panel that provided access to the user's iTunes library, iPhoto library and Movies folder at any time. It also provided a map view, which showed a flow chart of the project's menu system. Another feature was the ability to hide or show an approximation of the 'TV-safe area' (as old televisions often cut off some of a video's outer areas). iDVD also incorporated a 'One-Step DVD' function, which would automatically rewind the currently connected DV camcorder and burn a DVD of the video footage stored on the tape.

iDVD shipped with fonts (located at /Applications/iDVD.app/Contents/Resources/Fonts) that were not installed, to prevent them from being available to other applications by default.

Version history

See also 

 List of DVD authoring applications

References

MacOS-only software made by Apple Inc.
DVD
Video editing software
Products and services discontinued in 2011

ru:ILife#iDVD